Jobs Peak (Northern Paiute: Wangikudak) located in Alpine County, California, is the most prominent peak visible from the Carson Valley in Douglas County, Nevada.  The peak offers hiking and backcountry skiing with the view of Lake Tahoe. It is in the Humboldt-Toiyabe National Forest.

The mountain is named for Moses Job who opened a store in nearby Sheridan, Nevada in the early 1850s.

References

External links

Gallery

Mountains of the Sierra Nevada (United States)
Mountains of Alpine County, California
Mountains of Northern California